Peter Bishop Dixon AO FASSA (born 23 July 1946) is an Australian economist known for his work in general equilibrium theory and computable general equilibrium models. He has published several books and more than two hundred academic papers on economic modelling and economic policy analysis.

Career
Born in Melbourne to Herbert Bishop Dixon and Margaret Vera Laybourne-Smith, Dixon attended Melbourne Grammar School and Monash University (BEc, 1967), Harvard (AM, PhD 1972) where he worked as teaching assistant from 1970 to 1972.

Dixon then worked from 1972 until 1974 for the International Monetary Fund in Washington and for the Reserve Bank of Australia in Sydney in 1974/75. In 1974 he returned to Monash University. As a senior lecturer in the economics department and consultant to the Australian government's IMPACT project under Alan Powell until 1978, he started work on general equilibrium theory. Powell and Dixon were the joint recipients of the 1983 Research Medal of the Royal Society of Victoria. Dixon then worked as professor of economics at La Trobe University until 1984, with a visiting professorship at Harvard University in 1983. From 1984 until 1991, Dixon was professor of economics at the University of Melbourne and director of the Melbourne Institute of Applied Economic and Social Research. From 1991 until 2014 he served as director, later principal researcher, of the Centre of Policy Studies (CoPS) at Monash University. CoPS and Dixon then moved to Victoria University.

Dixon is mainly known for developing, with his collaborators, computable general equilibrium (CGE) models. A further development of Leif Johansen's multi-sectoral model, Dixon's ORANI model (1977, 1982), named after his wife, built on work by Paul Armington and Wassily Leontief its dynamic further development, the MONASH/VU-National model, and the US Applied General Equilibrium (USAGE) model which is widely used by the US government and the Global Trade Analysis Project. These models are available in CoPS's Gempack/RunGEM software implementation.

Dixon and his wife, Orani, have been married since 1968, and they have two daughters, including the academic Prof. Dr. Janine Margaret Dixon. Dixon is member of the Melbourne Cricket Club.

Awards
1982: Fellow of the Academy of the Social Sciences in Australia
1983: Dixon and Alan Powell were joint recipients of the Research Medal of the Royal Society of Victoria
1990: Giblin lecturer at the 59th ANZAAS congress
2001: Centenary Medal
2003: Distinguished Fellowship of the Economic Society of Australia
2006: Sir John Monash Distinguished Professor at Monash University
2015: Elected to the Hall of Fame in the Global Trade Analysis Project
2014: Appointed Officer of the Order of Australia (AO) in the 2014 Queen's Birthday Honours

Publications 
Dixon has published more than 200 working papers and contributed to several journals and books. His major books include:
 based on

References

External links 
 "Profile: Peter Dixon", Academy of the Social Sciences in Australia
 Peter Dixon, IDEAS database, access statistics, Research Papers in Economics
 Citations, Google Scholar
 Citation profile, Citations in Economics (CitEc)
 Profile, publications, Victoria University, Melbourne

1946 births
General equilibrium theorists
20th-century  Australian  economists
21st-century  Australian  economists
Academics from Melbourne
Monash University alumni
Harvard Graduate School of Arts and Sciences alumni
Academic staff of Monash University
Academic staff of La Trobe University
Harvard University faculty
Academic staff of the University of Melbourne
Academic staff of the Victoria University, Melbourne
Officers of the Order of Australia
Fellows of the Academy of the Social Sciences in Australia
Living people